The Museum of Fire is a museum of firefighting in the Lothians, sited in Edinburgh. It was first open from 1968 to 2016 and was due to reopen in 2022.

References

Firefighting museums in the United Kingdom
Emergency services museums in Scotland
1968 establishments in Scotland
Museums in Edinburgh